The Good King may refer to:

 The Good King (album), a 2013 album by Ghost Ship
 The Good King EP, a 2014 EP by Chris Rivers

See also
 The God King, a 1974 British–Sri Lankan historical film
 "The Good Kind", a song by The Wreckers from the 2006 album Stand Still, Look Pretty
 "The Good Knight and the Bad Knight", an episode of Little Knights